The 2010 season was Rajnavy's eighth season in the top division of Thai football. This article shows statistics of the club's players in the season, and also lists all matches that the club played in the season.

Team kit

Chronological list of events
10 November 2009: The Thai Premier League 2010 season first leg fixtures were announced.
24 October 2010: Rajnavy Rayong finished in 10th place in the Thai Premier League.

Current squad
Updated 7 January 2010

Results

Thai Premier League

League table

FA Cup

Third round

Fourth round

Quarter-final

League Cup

First round

1st Leg

2nd Leg

Second round

1st Leg

2nd Leg

Third round

1st Leg

2nd Leg

Queen's Cup

References

2010
Thai football clubs 2010 season